Vasant Vihar High School and Jr College (VVHS) is a private, co-educational, day school in Vasant Vihar, Thane, Maharashtra, India. It was established in 1990 by Goenka and Associates Educational Trust. The school has 7,500 pupils from kindergarten to grade 12. The medium of instruction is English. It is affiliated to the Indian Certificate of Secondary Education (ICSE).  For academic year 2022-23 the ICSE curriculum is followed from Grade I to Grade X.

VVHS is affiliated to Thane Police School. It has 150 teachers and provides facilities for special children with disabilities ranging from cerebral palsy to dyslexia and other learning disorders.

History
Vasant Vihar High School was started in 1990 with 35 students in the Amrapali Shopping Arcade with four staff.

References

External links
 School website

Education in Thane
High schools and secondary schools in Maharashtra